The second election for the Cardiganshire County Council took place in March 1892. It was preceded by the inaugural 1889 election and followed by the 1895 election.

Overview of the result

To some extent the euphoria of 1889 had passed three years later and the whole atmosphere was marked by less excitement. The result, however, was virtually identical to that of the inaugural election.

Boundary changes

One feature was that the multi-member seats, which existed in urban areas in the first elections, were divided so that all councillors were now elected to represent single member wards.

Unopposed returns
There were far more unopposed returns than three years previously.

Retiring aldermen
The following aldermen retired at the election:

Earl Of Lisburne, Conservative 
Rev Llewellyn Edwards, Liberal 
Jenkin Jenkins (Aeronian), Liberal
Daniel Jones, Liberal 
Rev John Davies, Liberal 
William Jones, Conservative 
Major Price Lewes, Conservative 
Jenkin Jenkins, Blaenplwyf, Liberal

Of the eight retiring aldermen, only Jenkin Jenkins and Llewellyn Edwards, both of whom were made aldermen as defeated candidates in 1889, sought election. Jenkins won at Llanfihangel Ystrad but Edwards was again defeated at Llanbadarn, this time by solicitor Hugh Hughes.

Contested elections

Most contests were again on party lines although there were several instances of Liberals opposing each other. The Conservatives had a few successes, notably at New Quay where Captain Longcroft of Llanina triumphed following divisions amongst local nonconformists.

The New Council

Elected Members

|}

Council following the election of aldermen and by-elections
Three Conservative / Unionist and five Liberal aldermen were elected, replicating the balance of the retiring aldermen.

|}

The Liberals strengthened their majority by capturing all three seats which became vacant following the election of aldermen.

|}

Ward results

Aberaeron

-->

Aberarth

-->

Aberbanc

-->

Aberporth

The ward was known as Blaenporth at the previous election but there was no boundary change.

Aberystwyth Division 1

-->

Aberystwyth Division 2

-->

Aberystwyth Division 3

-->

Aberystwyth Division 4

-->

There were boundary changes at Aberystwyth as the previous four-member ward was divided into four single-member wards. Liberal candidates held all seats in 1889 and 1892.

Borth

-->

Bow Street

-->

Cardigan North

Cardigan South

There were boundary changes at Cardigan as the previous two-member ward was divided into two single-member wards. In 1889 one Conservative and one Liberal councillor has been elected.

Cilcennin

Cwmrheidol

-->

Devil's Bridge

-->

Goginan

-->

Lampeter Borough

-->

Llanarth

-->

Llanbadarn Fawr

-->

Llanddewi Brefi

-->

Llandygwydd

-->

Llandysul North

Llandysul South

There were boundary changes at Llandysul as the previous two-member ward was divided into two single-member wards. Liberal candidates held both seats in 1889 and 1892.

Llandysiliogogo

-->

Llanfair Clydogau

-->

Llanfarian

-->

Llanfihangel y Creuddyn

-->

Llanfihangel Ystrad
Jenkin Jenkins, defeated in 1889 but subsequently made an alderman, successfully held the seat by a small margin.

-->

Llangoedmor

-->

Llangeitho

-->

Llangrannog

-->

Llanilar

-->

Llanrhystyd

-->

Llanllwchaiarn

There were boundary changes at Llanllwchaiarn and New Quay as the previous two-member ward was divided into two single-member wards. Liberal candidates held both seats in 1889.

Llansantffraed

-->

Llanwnen

-->

Llanwenog

-->

Lledrod

-->

Nantcwnlle

-->

New Quay
There were boundary changes at Llanllwchaiarn and New Quay as the previous two-member ward was divided into two single-member wards. Liberal candidates held both seats in 1889.

Penbryn

-->

Strata Florida

-->

Taliesin

-->

Talybont

-->

Trefeurig

-->

Tregaron

-->

Troedyraur

-->

Ysbyty Ystwyth

-->

Election of aldermen

In addition to the 48 councillors the council consisted of 16 county aldermen. Aldermen were elected by the council, and served a six-year term. Following the elections, the following aldermen were appointed by the newly elected council.

Peter Jones, Liberal (elected councillor at Trefeurig)
Jenkin Jenkins, Blaenplwyf, Liberal (retiring alderman, elected councillor at Llanfihangel Ystrad)
Evan Richards, Liberal (elected councillor at Llanfihangel y Creuddyn)
John Powell, Liberal (elected councillor at Troedyraur)
Col. Herbert Davies-Evans, Conservative (elected councillor at Llanwenog)
W.O. Brigstocke, Liberal (elected councillor at Llangoedmor)
D.W.E. Rowland, Conservative (elected councillor at Llanddewi Brefi)
Dr Jenkin Lewis, Conservative (elected councillor at Cilcennin)

In contrast to the initial elections, all eight aldermen selected in 1892 were elected members of the Council. The Conservatives were again allocated three places, although two of those selected had captured their seats from the Liberals at the recent election. Their elevation allowed the defeated Liberal candidates to be returned unopposed at the ensuing by-elections (see below).

Aldermanic vacancies, 1892-98
Colonel Davies-Evans decided not to accept a place on the aldermanic bench soon after the election. The Conservatives proposed that their nominee, David Lloyd, should occupy the vacancy but the Liberals were divided on the issue. In the ballot, Lloyd was elected by 19 votes against 18 for T.H.R. Hughes. As a result, the following appointment was made for six years in May 1892.

David Lloyd, Conservative (elected councillor at Lampeter)

By-elections
Six of the eight vacancies were filled unopposed and there were two contested elections. The Liberals captured all eight sets, including the three held by the Conservative or Unionist aldermen.

Cilcennin by-election
John Davies, elected in 1889, but defeated at the initial election, was returned unopposed.

Llanddewi Brefi by-election
D.J. Williams, who formerly represented Tregaron won a narrow victory.

Llanfihangel y Creuddyn by-election

Llanfihangel Ystrad by-election
Walter Davies had been narrowly defeated at the initial election. Jones was described as a working class candidate.

-->

Llangoedmor by-election
Following W.O. Brigstocke's election as alderman, David Samuel Jones of Llwyngrawys was elected unopposed.

-->

Llanwenog by-election
Following Colonel Davies-Evans's election as alderman his son was expected to contest the vacancy. However, he did not stand and Timothy Jones of Coedlanaufach, a farmer and Liberal, was returned unopposed.

Trefeurig by-election

-->

Troedyraur by-election

-->

By-elections 1892-1895

New Quay by-election 1892
There was also a by-election in New Quay following the death of Captain Longcroft within a few days of the election. In a close contest, Sir Marteine Lloyd of Bronwydd, famously defeated in 1889, narrowly defeated the former councillor John Owen Davies, holding the seat for the Conservatives.

-->

Lampeter by-election 1892

Lledrod by-election 1892
Roderick Lloyd (elected alderman in 1889) resigned on being appointed county surveyor and the Rev John Owen was elected in his place. In the resulting by-election two candidates were nominated. William Bebb withdrew too late to avoid an election but received no votes at the ensuing ballot.

Llangeitho by-election 1892
This by-election followed the death of Robert Joseph Davies

-->

Aberystwyth Division 3 by-election 1892
A by-election took place on 29 November 1892 following the death of John James. The Liberals retained the seat. 

-->

References

1892
1892 Welsh local elections
19th century in Ceredigion